The Ameris Bank Amphitheatre (formerly Verizon Amphitheatre) is a contemporary amphitheatre, located in the northern Atlanta suburb of Alpharetta, Georgia, United States.

The amphitheatre mainly hosts shows by popular music artists, comedians and themed symphony concerts by the Atlanta Symphony Orchestra, the latter opened the venue with a performance on May 10, 2008.

The venue opened as Verizon Wireless Amphitheatre at Encore Park in 2008. In January 2017, it became known as Verizon Amphitheatre. In December 2018, the venue’s naming rights were purchased by Ameris Bank.

Events

See also
List of contemporary amphitheatres

References

External links
Official website of Verizon Amphitheatre

Music venues in Georgia (U.S. state)
Verizon Wireless